The Eurovision Song Contest 1956 was the first edition of the annual Eurovision Song Contest, organised by the European Broadcasting Union (EBU) and host broadcasters the Swiss Broadcasting Corporation (SRG SSR) and  (RSI).

Inspired principally by the Italian Sanremo Music Festival, held annually since 1951, the concept of a televised European song contest, initially proposed by Italian broadcaster RAI, was formulated by an EBU committee led by Swiss broadcaster and executive Marcel Bezençon. Following approval at the EBU's General Assembly in 1955, the rules and structure of the contest were agreed upon. Several of the rules utilised in this first contest would subsequently be altered for future editions, and it remains the only edition in which each country was represented by two songs, with only solo performers allowed to compete, and a voting process which was held in secret and where juries could vote for the entries from their own country.

Seven countries participated in the inaugural edition of the contest, and the first winner was the host country , with the song "" performed by Lys Assia. The result was determined by an assembled jury composed of two jurors from each country, with each juror ranking each song between 1 and 10 points. Only the winning country and song were announced at the conclusion of the event, with the results of the remaining participants unknown. Even though it was broadcast on television and radio via the Eurovision network in ten countries, no video footage of the event is known to exist, bar clips of the reprise performance of the winning song; the majority of the broadcast is, however, available in audio.

Origins 

The European Broadcasting Union (EBU) was formed in 1950 among 23 organisations with the aim of facilitating creative cooperation and the exchange of television programmes. The word "Eurovision" was first used as a telecommunications term in the United Kingdom in 1951, in reference to a programme by the British Broadcasting Corporation (BBC) being relayed by Dutch television, and was subsequently used as the title for the union's new transmission network upon its creation in 1954. Following the formation of the EBU, a number of notable events were transmitted through its networks in several European countries, including Belgium, France, West Germany, the Netherlands and the United Kingdom. A series of international exchange programmes were subsequently organised for 1954, with this "European Television Season" relayed live across Europe through the Eurovision network.

Following this series of transmissions, a "Programme Committee" was set up within the EBU to investigate new initiatives for cooperation between broadcasters each year, with Marcel Bezençon of the Swiss Broadcasting Corporation (SRG SSR) serving as the committee's first president. This committee agreed to study the concept for a new televised European song contest during a meeting in January 1955, a concept initially proposed by the Italian broadcaster RAI and inspired by the broadcaster's Sanremo Music Festival, held annually since 1951. The new European contest was subsequently approved at the EBU's annual General Assembly in October 1955, leading to the creation of the European Grand Prix.

Location 

The first Eurovision Song Contest took place in Lugano, Switzerland; the country was awarded the contest in October 1955 at the EBU's General Assembly following an offer by the Swiss Broadcasting Corporation (SRG SSR) to stage the event. In addition Switzerland made a logical choice from a technical perspective for the hosting of what was an experiment in live, simultaneous, cross-border transmissions, as its geographically central location in Europe facilitated terrestrial broadcasts across the continent, as well as being the host country for the EBU's headquarters.

Taking its inspiration from the Italian Sanremo Music Festival and Venice International Song Festival, a similar EBU-organised song contest held in 1955 and broadcast on radio, Lugano in the Italian-speaking canton of Ticino was chosen as the first host city by SRG SSR, with Italian-language member broadcaster  (RSI) in charge of the production. The theatre, used for theatrical and musical performances, ballroom dance and other shows, closed shortly after featuring its last performance in April 1997 before being demolished in 2001 to make room for the extension of the casino.

Format 

A planning sub-group, headed by Eduard Hass of SRG SSR, was subsequently formed following the sign-off on the organisation of the event to build out the rules of the competition. Taking inspiration from the Sanremo Music Festival and the Venice International Song Festival as a basis in planning the new contest, the group made several amendments and additions to these rules to suit its international nature. Ideas suggested but ultimately rejected during this planning phase included featuring each song a second time with a piano accompaniment instead of orchestral backing, as well as technical initiatives such as a separate producer from each participating country involved in the contest's organisation. Prize money for the winners was also ruled out at this stage. The rules of the contest were finalised and distributed to EBU members in early 1956. The rules set out in detail the criteria for the participating songs and performers; production details and requirements; timelines for the submission of materials by the participating broadcasters; the method by which the winning song would be determined; details related to the financing of the event; and the responsibilities which lay with the host broadcaster and the participating broadcasters.

Per the rules of the contest, each participating country, represented by one EBU member organisation, submitted into the contest a maximum of two songs of between three and three-and-a-half minutes in duration, which must have been solely original compositions. Each participating organisation had sole discretion on how to select their entries for the contest but were strongly encouraged by the EBU to hold their own national contests to determine their representatives. Only solo artists were permitted to compete. Following the performance of all songs, the winner was determined by juries from each country composed of two individuals, with each individual member rating secretly each song between one and ten points, including those representing their own country, with higher scores given to more appreciated songs. The jury followed the contest in a separate room in the same venue in Lugano through a small television screen, replicating the conditions as close as possible to how viewers at home would watch the contest. The winning song was thus that which gained the highest score from the votes of all jury members. The jury members from Luxembourg were unable to attend the contest in Lugano, and subsequently the EBU allowed two Swiss nationals to vote in their place. This would remain the only contest in which many of these rules would be utilised, and several changes were made ahead of the 1957 contest. These included restricting each country to only one song, expanding the number of performers allowed to participate for each country, introducing a more visible voting system, and restricting each country from voting for their own entry.

Each song was accompanied by a 24-piece orchestra, with members of the Radiosa Orchestra supplemented by strings of the Italian Swiss Radio Symphony Orchestra, presided over by the contest's musical director, Fernando Paggi. Each participating country was allowed to supplement the orchestra with their own musical director for the performances of their country. Participating broadcasters were required to submit to the EBU by 10 May 1956 scores for the participating songs for use by the orchestra, audio recordings for each participating song, and copies of the song lyrics for each song in the original language, as well as translations into French or English to aid the jury members and commentators. The confirmed selection of each country's musical director (if separate to that of the host) was required to be communicated between 21 and 24 May.

Rehearsals in the contest venue with the competing artists and the orchestra began on 21 May 1956, and the contest was held on 24 May 1956, beginning at 21:00 CET (20:00 UTC) with an approximate duration of 1 hour 40 minutes. The event was hosted in Italian by Lohengrin Filipello. This remains the only time in which the contest was hosted by a solo male presenter, and one of only two contests not to feature a female presenter, alongside the  held 61 years later. Additionally this would remain the only contest to feature a male presenter for 22 years, when the  featured a male and female presenting duo. Upon the announcement of the results, only the winning song was named, with the full breakdown of the jury votes not revealed. The winning artist then returned to the stage for a reprise performance of the winning song to end the broadcast.

Participating countries 

The order in which the countries and songs were performed was determined artistically by the Swiss broadcasters, with input and support by the musical directors from each country.

Conductors 
As specified in the rules of the contest, each country was allowed to nominate their own musical director to lead the orchestra during the performance of their country's entries, with the host musical director also conducting for those countries which did not nominate their own conductor. The conductors listed below led the orchestra during both performances for the indicated countries.

 Fernando Paggi
 Fernando Paggi
 Léo Souris
 Fernando Paggi
 Franck Pourcel
 Jacques Lasry

Participants and results 

Two of the performers, Switzerland's Lys Assia and Luxembourg's Michèle Arnaud, performed both entries for their respective countries.

The winning song was "", composed by Géo Voumard, written by Émile Gardaz, performed by Lys Assia and representing the host country . During the reprise performance of the winning song, Assia became emotional and suffered a lapse in memory of the song's lyrics, subsequently requesting a restart by the orchestra.

The full results of the contest were not revealed and have not been retained by the EBU. Attempts to reconstruct the voting through interviews with jury members have also failed to reveal a reliable result. An article in Italian newspaper  published on 25 May 1956, the day after the contest, reported that Switzerland's winning entry received 102 points in total, but this has not been corroborated by the contest organisers.

Broadcasts 

Each participating broadcaster was required to relay the contest via its networks. Non-participating EBU member broadcasters were also able to relay the contest as "passive participants". In addition to the television channels of the seven participating broadcasters and three non-participating passive broadcasters, the contest was also broadcast live on seven radio networks and recorded for later transmission by another 13. The United Kingdom's BBC took only partial live transmission of the event, joining 45 minutes into the contest and only showing the second set of entries from each country. Broadcasters were able to send commentators to provide coverage of the contest in their own native language and to relay information about the artists and songs to their television viewers. Known details on the broadcasts in each country, including the specific broadcasting stations and commentators, are shown in the tables below.

No video footage of the entire contest is known to exist, with the only known footage being clips of the reprise performance of the winning song via newsreel and other recordings. Audio of most of the contest has, however, survived, missing only part of the interval act, and attempts to find audiovisual materials related to the contest have yielded some results in recent years, including a large cache of photographs and some video footage taken by Swiss photographer Vincenzo Vicari from inside the venue.

Notes and references

Notes

References

Bibliography

External links 

 

 
1956
Music festivals in Switzerland
1956 in music
1956 in Switzerland
20th century in Lugano
Events in Lugano
May 1956 events in Europe
Music in Lugano